Grant Billmeier is a former European professional basketball player and  currently Assistant Coach for Maryland Terrapins men's basketball.

Career
Billmeier is listed at 6'10," 252 lbs  and is a former player of the Seton Hall University Pirates in the Big East. A resident of Pennington, New Jersey, Billmeier attended The Pennington School there for his freshman year, and then transferred to St. Patrick High School in Elizabeth, New Jersey where he played for the remainder of his high school career. He wore the number 33 at St. Patrick's, but wore 41 at Seton Hall his freshman and sophomore years because the number 33 was already taken by Andre Sweet. Upon Sweet's graduation, Billmeier had his number changed back to 33. He was recruited as a three star prospect as per Scout.com. In 2007, he went overseas to join Würzburg Baskets (German 3rd division), where he was the starting center and helped his team to finish 3rd in the league. After one season in Würzburg, fan favorite Billmeier joined AD Vagos.

In 2008, Billmeier started a basketball summer camp with longtime friend and former Villanova star Mike Nardi.

Billmeier became an assistant coach of his alma mater team in the 2010.

Awards

Robin Cunningham Award for best academics
Richie Regan Award
All-State Second Team selection (H.S.)

References

External links
Seton Hall Pirates profile
Scout.com Report
ChicagoSports Rivals Report

1984 births
Living people
American expatriate basketball people in Portugal
Basketball players from New Jersey
People from Pennington, New Jersey
Seton Hall Pirates men's basketball players
Sportspeople from Mercer County, New Jersey
The Patrick School alumni
The Pennington School alumni
American men's basketball players
Centers (basketball)